The 2020–21 season was A.C. Pisa 1909's second consecutive season in second division of the Italian football league, the Serie B, and the 112th as a football club.

Players

First-team quad

Out on loan

Pre-season and friendlies

Competitions

Overall record

Serie B

League table

Results summary

Results by round

Matches

Coppa Italia

References

Pisa S.C.
Pisa